María Sonia Cristoff (born 1965) is an Argentine writer. She was born in Trelew but since the early 1980s has been based in Buenos Aires.
Falsa Calma was translated into English by Katherine Silver in 2018.

Career
She writes both fiction and non fiction. Some of her usual topics are cultural practices such as walking and travelling, the relationship between humans and animals, isolation, and life in contemporary metropolis. She wrote Falsa calma [A False Calm, 2005], a journey through ghost towns in Patagonia; Desubicados [Misfits, 2006], a novella taking place in a single day at the Buenos Aires zoo; and the novel Bajo influencia [Under the Influence, 2010]. The line between the fictional and the documentary is somehow blurred in her writing. Her books as an editor (Patagonia, Idea crónica and Pasaje a Oriente) are related to the same subjects as her narrative. 
She teaches creative writing at Centro Cultural Ricardo Rojas (Universidad de Buenos Aires) and has participated as a writer in residency in Leipzig, Germany, and at the International Writing Program at the University of Iowa. Her literary pieces and criticism have been published in different newspapers and magazines from her country and abroad, and her narrative and essays have been included in different collective volumes.

All of her works have been translated into German and published by Berenberg Verlag.

Publications

 Acento extranjero [Foreign Accent], Buenos Aires, Editorial Sudamericana, 2000
 Patagonia, Buenos Aires, Cántaro editores, 2005
 Falsa calma [A False Calm], Buenos Aires, Editorial Seix Barral, 2005. Published in Germany by Berenberg Verlag, 2010
 Idea crónica [Chronical Idea], Rosario, Beatriz Viterbo Editora, 2006
 Desubicados [Misfits], Buenos Aires, Editorial Sudamericana, 2006. Published in Germany by Berenberg Verlag, 2012
 Pasaje a Oriente [Passage to the Orient], Buenos Aires, Fondo de Cultura Económica, 2009
 Bajo influencia [Under the Influence], Buenos Aires, Editorial Edhasa, 2010
 Inclúyanme afuera [Include me out], Buenos Aires, Editorial Mardulce, 2014. Published in Germany by Berenberg Verlag. 2015
 Mal de época. Mardulce Editora, 211 pp., 2017

See also
 Lists of writers

References 

1965 births
Living people
Argentine women writers
International Writing Program alumni
Argentine women historians
21st-century Argentine historians